"18 til I Die" is a song written by Canadian guitarist, singer and composer Bryan Adams with Robert John "Mutt" Lange for Adams' seventh studio album, 18 til I Die (1996). Its lyrics are about maintaining youthful traits, even as one grows older. Released as a single in Canada in 1996 and in the United Kingdom on April 7, 1997, it peaked at number 21 on the Canadian RPM Top Singles chart and number 22 on the UK Singles Chart. Six songs recorded live at Adams' Wembley Stadium concert on July 27, 1996, were included as B-sides to its single release, spread out over two discs. They were later included in the album release of the concert. Adams continues to play this song at his concerts.

Critical reception
Larry Flick from Billboard wrote, "The title cut to Adams' sadly underappreciated current album kicks with the kind of guitar-happy rock heat that makes radio fun to listen to during the summer. Fans of the singer who still go back to oldies like "Summer Of '69" would be wise to give this jam a listen, as it has a similar "forever young" energy and a stomping, anthemic beat. A perfect choice for car-stereo belters and closet air-guitar heroes." Another editor, Paul Verna felt that "he is far less effective when he tries to sound adolescent, as he does on the title track". Daina Darzin from Cash Box stated that it "is sure to be a radio fave of yuppies everywhere". 

Dominic Pride from Music & Media commented, "In this pean to puberty Adams jokes about "being 18 goin' on 55"—possibly, one suspects, without a stroke of irony. The Canadian rocker continues to deliver rock standards which radio will use into the next decade, and this one is an anthem which you can easily see Adams using as a closing number at any one of his epic gigs."

Charts

References

Bryan Adams songs
1996 singles
1996 songs
A&M Records singles
Song recordings produced by Robert John "Mutt" Lange
Songs written by Bryan Adams
Songs written by Robert John "Mutt" Lange